SBCS, or Single Byte Character Set, is used to refer to character encodings that use exactly one byte for each graphic character. An SBCS can accommodate a maximum of 256 symbols, and is useful for scripts that do not have many symbols or accented letters such as the Latin, Greek and Cyrillic scripts used mainly for European languages. Examples of SBCS encodings include ISO/IEC 646, the various ISO 8859 encodings, and the various Microsoft/IBM code pages.

The term SBCS is commonly contrasted against the terms DBCS (double-byte character set) and TBCS (triple-byte character set), as well as MBCS (multi-byte character set).  The multi-byte character sets are used to accommodate languages with scripts that have large numbers of characters and symbols, predominantly Asian languages such as Chinese, Japanese, and Korean. These are sometimes referred to by the acronym CJK. In these computing systems, SBCSs are traditionally associated with half-width characters, so-called because such SBCS characters would traditionally occupy half the width of a DBCS character on a fixed-width computer terminal or text screen.

See also
DBCS
TBCS
MBCS
Variable-width encoding

References

Character encoding